Frederick or Fred Roberts may refer to:

Military
 Frederick Roberts, 1st Earl Roberts (1832–1914), British Army field marshal and Victoria Cross recipient
 Frederick Roberts (VC, born 1872) (1872–1899), British Army officer and Victoria Cross recipient, son of the above
 Fred Roberts, British soldier and editor of the First World War trench newspaper The Wipers Times
 Fred Roberts (RAF officer) (1913–1996), British Royal Air Force officer and cricketer

Politics
 Frederick Roberts (British politician) (1876–1941), British Labour Party Member of Parliament, 1918–1931, 1935–1941
 Frederick Madison Roberts (1879–1952), first African-American elected to the California State Assembly

Sports
 Frederick Roberts (cricketer, born 1848) (1848–1903), English cricketer for Surrey
 Frederick G. Roberts (1862–1936), English cricketer for Gloucestershire
 Fred Roberts (baseball) (1873–?), American baseball player
 Fred Roberts (American football coach) (1875–1959), coach of the Oklahoma Sooners in 1901
 Fred Roberts (rugby union) (1881–1956), New Zealand rugby union footballer who played for The Original All Blacks
 Frederick Roberts (Somerset cricketer) (1881–?), English cricketer for Somerset
 Fred Roberts (footballer, born 1905) (1905–1988), Irish footballer
 Fred Roberts (American football guard) (born 1907), player for Iowa Hawkeyes and Portsmouth Spartans
 Fred Roberts (footballer, born 1909) (1909–1979), English football forward, played for Birmingham and Luton Town in the 1930s
 Fred Roberts (born 1960), American basketball player

Others
 Fred C. Roberts (1862–1894), English physician and medical missionary
 Fred S. Roberts (born 1943), American mathematician